Chicago Shakespeare Theater (CST) is a non-profit, professional theater company located at Navy Pier in Chicago, Illinois.  Its more than six hundred annual performances performed 48 weeks of the year include its critically acclaimed Shakespeare series, its World's Stage touring productions, and youth education and family oriented programming.  The theater had garnered 77 Joseph Jefferson awards and three Laurence Olivier Awards. In 2008, it was the winner of the Regional Theatre Tony Award.

Founded in 1986 in a pub, in 1999 the CST moved to a purpose-built seven-story theater complex on Navy Pier, where it has a main 500 seat space called the Courtyard, and the 200 seat Theater Upstairs.  In 2017, it expanded on the pier into a connected three-theater-campus with the addition of The Yard, a flexible space that allows for versatile arrangements from 150 seats to 850 seats and from proscenium to in-the-round.

Background
The company's present artistic director Barbara Gaines founded the theater in 1986, when it began performances on the roof of the Red Lion Pub in the city's Lincoln Park neighborhood.  In 1999, the company received permission to build its permanent home: a two-venue facility at Navy Pier.

Productions at the theater include works from the Shakespearean canon as well as other plays and musicals.  In addition to its own original productions, the Chicago Shakespeare Theater also hosts touring productions from other theater companies.

Chicago Shakespeare Theater is part of Theatre Communications Group (TCG), the Shakespeare Theatre Association of America (STAA) and National Alliance for Musical Theatre (NAMT) and the National Council of Teachers of English (NCTE).

History
Chicago Shakespeare Theater was founded as the Chicago Shakespeare Workshop by current Artistic Director Barbara Gaines in 1986, a name which was changed a year later to the Chicago Shakespeare Repertory and finally in 1999 to Chicago Shakespeare Theater.  It performed its first twelve seasons in residency at the Ruth Page Theater, where it performed titles ranging from better-known Shakespeare plays such as Hamlet and King Lear as well as lesser-known titles such as Troilus and Cressida and Timon of Athens.  Although the theater was critically lauded for its innovative approach to classic works, it was limited by the age and spatial restrictions of the Ruth Page Theater and began looking for a new performance space in the late 1990s.

In 1997, CST announced its plans to move from the Ruth Page to a new facility located at Navy Pier, a place better known for its family attractions and in fact the most popular tourist attraction in the Midwest.  The move was accompanied by a public relations blitz, which even involved Mayor Richard M. Daley naming April 23, 1997, as Shakespeare Repertory Day.  The company began a large-scale capital campaign to finance the move, and opened its 1999-2000 season in its new, state-of-the-art facility.  Since then, CST has grown from the third-largest theater company in Chicago to the third-largest in the entire Midwest, at a rate 400% faster than the industry growth trend.

Facilities
Chicago Shakespeare Theater has, since October 1999, been in residence in a purpose built, seven-story,  facility at Chicago's Navy Pier, which houses its box office, administrative offices, and performance venues. The first performance at this facility was Eric Idle reading from his novel The Road to Mars.

The 510-seat Courtyard Theater, which is the primary production venue for CST, features state-of-the-art technology and acoustics together with a versatile thrust stage and deep proscenium, that create a flexible performance space. A second theater, the 200-seat black box "Upstairs" space, is devoted to smaller but still-popular productions such as The Second City's smash hit, Romeo and Juliet Musical: The People Vs. Friar Laurence, The Man Who Killed Romeo and Juliet.

Awards 
 2016 production of The Tempest received the 2016 Joseph Jefferson Award

References

External links

 Chicago Shakespeare Theater official website
 
 Navy Pier 
 Theater Communications Group

1974 establishments in Illinois
Theatre companies in Chicago
Tony Award winners
Regional theatre in the United States
Shakespeare festivals in the United States